The 2008 Alaska Republican presidential caucuses were held on February 5, 2008, and has a total of 26 delegates at stake. Mitt Romney won the state, and, as the winner in Alaska's congressional district, was awarded all of that district's delegates. All results are from the presidential preference poll held at the caucuses. Actual delegates were selected on February 5 or 9 at district conventions held throughout the state, and finally at a statewide convention held between March 13–15 in Anchorage.

Candidates
Mike Huckabee
John McCain
Ron Paul
Mitt Romney

Candidates Rudy Giuliani, Duncan L. Hunter and Fred Thompson dropped out of the presidential race before the primary.

Results

See also
2008 Alaska Democratic presidential caucuses
2008 Republican Party presidential primaries

References

2008 Alaska elections
Alaska
2008
2008 Super Tuesday